This road is in northern Iran. It connects Sarakhs at the border with Turkmenistan to Mashhad, then to Gorgan, and afterwards it runs parallel to the Caspian Sea. Most parts of this road are expressways but some of them are in the Golestan Jungle.

Plans

Langrud Bypass
A bypass in Langrud, Gilan with a length of 11 km is under construction. Once completed, it will be incorporated as part of this route.

Nur and Royan Bypass
A bypass around Nur and Royan, Mazandaran Province with plans to be extended to bypass Izadshahr as well is under construction. The length is to be 35km. Once completed, it will be incorporated as part of this route.

Mahmudabad Bypass
A bypass in Mahmudabad, Mazandaran with a length of 12.6 km is under construction. Once completed, 6 km of it will be incorporated as part of this route.

Babol Southern Bypass
Babol Southern Bypass Expressway in Babol, Mazandaran with a length of 16 km is under construction. Once completed, it will be incorporated as part of this route.

Twinning plans
There is an ongoing construction project to twin the section in between Gorgan-Bojnurd with a total length of 300 km. Some parts of it are already operational.

Gallery

References

22
Transportation in Ardabil Province
Transportation in Gilan Province
Transportation in Golestan Province
Transportation in Mazandaran Province
Transportation in North Khorasan Province
Transportation in Razavi Khorasan Province